The Doak VZ-4 (or Doak Model 16) was an American prototype Vertical Takeoff and Landing (VTOL) aircraft built in the 1950s for service in the United States Army. Only a single prototype was built, and the U.S. Army withdrew it from active trials in 1963.

Development

Edmund R. Doak, Jr., a self-taught engineer and vice president of Douglas Aircraft Company, founded Doak Aircraft Company in Torrance, California, in 1940. The company grew to 4,000 employees during World War II, with subcontracts from every major American aircraft manufacturer. These included molded plywood fuselages for trainers such as the AT-6 and Vultee BT-13, and doors, hatches and gun turrets for a multitude of aircraft.

Doak proposed a VTOL aircraft to the U.S. Armys Army Transportation and Research and Engineering Command at Fort Eustis in Newport News, Virginia, in 1950. He touted the aircraft as able to take off and land in a small area, hover and loiter over a target area, and fly backwards like a helicopter without the noise and vibration of a helicopter, while also having the horizontal cruising ability, high speed, wing-mounted weapons, and mission flexibility of a conventional fixed-wing fighter aircraft. Knowing that a Soviet attack on airbases would interdict takeoffs and landings by conventional aircraft, the Army found Doaks proposal attractive, and on 10 April 1956, it awarded Doak a contract to produce a single prototype for use as a research aircraft.

The aircraft, designated the Doak Model 16 by the Doak company and assigned the serial number 56-9642, was originally powered by an  Lycoming YT53 turboprop engine mounted in the fuselage, later replaced by a  Lycoming T53-L-1 turbine. The engine drove two wingtip-mounted fiberglass tilting ducted fan propellers through a "T" box on the engine that transmitted power to the propellers via a 4-inch (102-mm) aluminum tubular shaft and two smaller shafts. Each propeller was 48-inch (1.22-meter) in diameter and the duct outer diameter was 60-inches (1.52-meter)). The fans were positioned vertically for takeoff and landing – with a rotation speed of 4,800 rpm required for liftoff – and rotated to a horizontal orientation for horizontal flight, the first time this VTOL propulsion concept was tested successfully. The aircraft had metal wings and a metal tail. To save weight, the aircraft originally was constructed of uncovered welded steel tubing, but after it was found that the open frame interfered with forward-speed tests, molded fiberglass was installed over its nose section and thin aluminum sheeting over its aft fuselage. It accommodated a two-person crew, with a pilot and observer seated in tandem in the cockpit. The pilot used a standard stick and rudder to control the aircraft. Its landing gear were taken from a Cessna 182 Skylane, its seats from a North American P-51 Mustang, and its duct actuators from a Lockheed T-33 Shooting Star.

Flight testing began at Torrance Municipal Airport, and Doak completed several tests by 1958. The Model 16 hovered for the first time on 25 February 1958, and the first transition from vertical to horizontal flight (and back again) took place on 5 May 1958. Although the prototype generally was successful, its short takeoff and landing performance was less than hoped for and it displayed a tendency to nose up while making the transition from vertical to horizontal flight.

Doaks engineers believed that they could solve the prototypes problems, and after taxiing testing, 32 hours of flight testing in a test stand, and 18 hours of tethered hovering, the aircraft was transferred to Edwards Air Force Base, California, in October 1958.

Operational history

The U.S. Army accepted the prototype in September 1959, designated it the Doak VZ-4DA, and passed it to the NASA Langley Research Center in Hampton, Virginia, for further testing. When Doak laid off 90 percent of his employees late in 1960 due to a recession in the aircraft industry, Douglas Aircraft took over the project, purchased its patent rights and engineering files, and hired four engineers from Doak to continue work on the VZ-4DA.

Work continued on the VZ-4DA until 1963, when the U.S. Army decided that the helicopter would meet its VTOL requirements, shifted funding away from the design and testing of unconventional VTOL aircraft to the design and procurement of helicopters, and discontinued trials of the VZ-4DA. The National Aeronautics and Space Administration (NASA), later acquired the aircraft. In 1973, it was transferred to Fort Eustis and placed in storage.

Preservation
 
The VZ-4DA was eventually donated to the U.S. Army Transportation Museum at Fort Eustis, Virginia, where it is on public display with other aircraft in the museum's outdoor Aviation Pavilion. Other Doak artifacts are preserved at the Western Museum of Flight in Torrance, California.

Operators
USA
National Aeronautics and Space Administration (NASA)
United States Army

Specifications

See also

References

Bibliography

 The Illustrated Encyclopedia of Aircraft (Part Work 1982–1985). London: Orbis Publishing, 1985.
 Harding, Stephen. U.S. Army Aircraft Since 1947. Shrewsbury, UK: Airlife Publishing, Ltd., 1990. .
 Lobb, Charles. Torrance Airport. Charleston, South Carolina: Arcadia Publishing, 2006. .
 Parker, Dana T. Building Victory: Aircraft Manufacturing in the Los Angeles Area in World War II . Cypress, California: Dana T. Parker Books, 2013. .
 Stevenson, Roy, "Doak's One-Off," Aviation History, July 2014, pp. 14–15.
 Swanborough, F.G. and Peter M. Bowers. United States Military Aircraft since 1909. London: Putnam, 1963.

Further reading
 

VZ-4, Doak
Tilting ducted fan aircraft
VZ-4
Mid-engined aircraft
Turboshaft-powered aircraft
Mid-wing aircraft